The Josslyn Island Site is an archaeological site composed of a shell mound in Lee County, Florida, United States.

In mid-1983, the shell mound was cleared and mapped by archaeologists from the Southwest Florida Archaeological Society, operating with funds donated by Don Randell, the owner. Most of the shells in the mound are those of whelks and conchs; noticeably absent are oyster and clam shells. Although the dates of the shells are unknown, they are believed to have been deposited by Calusa peoples during or soon before European contact.

The mound has only rarely been visited since the beginning of the twentieth century; except for a few non-archaeologists who attempted to excavate the site, the 1983 survey was the first known human visit since the site was recorded in 1896.  Seeing the high state of preservation in which the Josslyn Island Shell Mound exists, researchers have proposed that it may hold significant stores of knowledge about its creators.  In recognition of its archaeological value, the site was listed on the National Register of Historic Places in 1978.  It is one of eight Lee County archaeological sites to be included on the Register.

References

External links
 Lee County listings at Florida's Office of Cultural and Historical Programs

Archaeological sites in Florida
National Register of Historic Places in Lee County, Florida
Shell middens in Florida
Archaeological sites on the National Register of Historic Places in Florida
Pine Island (Lee County, Florida)